Krstač is an ancient variety of grape that is indigenous to Serbia and Montenegro. A high quality dry white wine is made from it. The wine may be rich, of harmonious bouquet and of light yellow color with 12.5% alcohol.

Synonyms 
Krstač is also known under the synonyms Beli Krstac, Bijela Krata, Bijela Loza, Bijela Vinogradarska, Bijeli Krstac, Krata Bijela, Krsta Bijela, Krstac Bijeli, Krstaca Bijela, Krstach Bianco, Loza Bijela, and Vinogradarska Bijela.

References

See also 
 Plantaže

White wine grape varieties
Montenegrin wine
Grape varieties of Serbia
Grape varieties of Montenegro